Jordanita cognata is a moth of the family Zygaenidae. It is found in northern Algeria and western Tunisia.

The length of the forewings is 14–17.5 mm for males and 10.5–11.5 mm for females. Adults are on wing from April to May.

References

C. M. Naumann, W. G. Tremewan: The Western Palaearctic Zygaenidae. Apollo Books, Stenstrup 1999,

External links
The Barcode of Life Data Systems (BOLD)

Procridinae
Moths described in 1852